The Minghetti I government of Italy held office from 24 March 1863 until 28 September 1864, a total of 554 days, or 1 year, 6 months and 4 days.

Government parties
The government was composed by the following parties:

Composition

References

Italian governments
1863 establishments in Italy